Mysore South or South Mysore is a cluster of suburbs lying on the southern side of Mysore city in Karnataka province in India.

Post office
The Mysore South post office is located at J.P.Nagar and the postal code is 570008
Mysore south has a police station

Constituent suburbs
Mysore south comprises the following suburbs of Mysore: 
 Mysore Airport road
 Kuvempu Nagar
 J.P.Nagar
 Ramakrishna Nagar
 Mananthavady Road
 Ooty Road
 Srirampur
 Ashokapuram
 Chamarajapuram
 Ashokapuram, Mysore

Economy
Some parts of southern Mysore are entirely residential.  Ramakrishna Nagar, Srirampur and Kuvempu Nagar are examples for this.  Some other parts are heavily industrialised and accommodate a large number of industrial workers.  J.P.Nagar and Ashokapuram are examples for this type of area.

Transportation
There are two railway stations in south Mysore: Chamarajapuram railway station and Ashokapuram railway station

Landmarks
 Lingam Budhi Lake
 Central Railway workshop
 Sewage Farm
 Mysore Airport

Gallery

See also
Kuvempu Nagar
Jayaprakash Nagar Mysore
Manantahavady Road
Srirampur
Chamarajapuram
 Vidyaranyapura, Mysore
 Ashokapuram, Mysore

References

 
Suburbs of Mysore